IROC XXI was the twenty-first season of the International Race of Champions, which started on February 17, 1997. The series used identically prepared Pontiac Firebird Trans Am race cars, and contested races at Daytona International Speedway, Charlotte Motor Speedway, California Speedway, and Michigan International Speedway. Mark Martin won $225,000 and the IROC championship, his second straight win and third in four seasons.

The roster of drivers and final points standings were as follows:

Race results

Daytona International Speedway, Race One

 Al Unser Jr.
 Mark Martin
 Dale Earnhardt
 Randy LaJoie
 Tommy Kendall
 Terry Labonte
 Dale Jarrett
 Robby Gordon
 Jeff Gordon
 Alex Zanardi
 Darrell Waltrip
 Jimmy Vasser

Charlotte Motor Speedway, Race Two

 Mark Martin
 Robby Gordon
 Jeff Gordon
 Jimmy Vasser
 Al Unser Jr.
 Terry Labonte
 Randy LaJoie
 Dale Earnhardt
 Tommy Kendall
 Dale Jarrett
 Darrell Waltrip
 Alex Zanardi

California Speedway, Race Three

 Mark Martin
 Bobby Labonte 1
 Terry Labonte
 Randy LaJoie
 Jeff Gordon
 Al Unser Jr.
 Tommy Kendall
 Dale Jarrett
 Dale Earnhardt
 Jimmy Vasser
 Darrell Waltrip
 Alex Zanardi

Michigan International Speedway, Race Four

 Randy LaJoie
 Robby Gordon
 Dale Jarrett
 Al Unser Jr.
 Tommy Kendall
 Terry Labonte
 Dale Earnhardt
 Mark Martin
 Jeff Gordon
 Jimmy Vasser
 Darrell Waltrip
 Alex Zanardi

Notes
 Bobby Labonte drove for Robby Gordon in Race 3.

References

International Race of Champions
1997 in American motorsport